Ride with the Devil was a New Zealand drama which aired at 11pm on Tuesdays night on TVNZ's TV2.

The story was about two great racing fans -  Alex Mack(Xavier Horan) and Lin Jin (Andy Wong).  Williams was a local kiwi while Lin was a rich exchange student from Beijing, China. Jin is introduced to the Auckland street racing scene, but things go horribly wrong and someone is killed.

Cast
 Xavier Horan as Kurt Williams
 Andy Wong as Lin Gin
 Caleigh Cheung as  Amy, Lin's cousin, a "good-girl".
 Lynette Forday as Wendy, Amy's mother and Lin's very over-protective aunt.
 C. K. Cheung as Ray Wong, good friend of Amy's dead father and Lin's uncle, a professor of Asian Business in a local university.
 Anna Hutchison as Pony, Amy's best friend Pony.
 Ryan Richards as Marko
 Angela Bloomfield as Shona.

External links
Ride with the Devil (Official Website)
Karen Kay Management - Andy Wong

2007 New Zealand television series debuts
New Zealand drama television series
Television shows funded by NZ on Air
TVNZ 2 original programming